The 1960 Michigan gubernatorial election was held on November 8, 1960. Democratic nominee John B. Swainson defeated Republican nominee Paul Douglas Bagwell with 50.48% of the vote.

General election

Candidates
Major party candidates
John B. Swainson, Democratic 
Paul Douglas Bagwell, Republican

Other candidates
Robert Himmel Jr., Socialist Workers
Delmar D. Gibbons, Prohibition
F. J. Toohey, Tax Cut
Theos A. Grove, Socialist labor
R. Roy Pursell, Independent American

Results

Primaries 
The primary elections occurred on August 2, 1960.

Democratic primary

Republican primary

References

1960
Michigan
Gubernatorial
November 1960 events in the United States